The 2009–10 Philadelphia 76ers season was the 71st season of the franchise, 61st in the National Basketball Association (NBA). The season was memorable on December 2 when Allen Iverson returned to the team for his second stint with the Sixers. However, it was short lived as he left the team in February to attend to his then 4-year-old daughter Messiah's health issues. Although Iverson was selected to play in what could have been his 11th consecutive All-Star Game, he backed out due to personal reasons. In March, it was announced that Iverson would not return to the 76ers for the rest of the season. The Sixers season ended with a disappointing 27-55 record. After the season, Eddie Jordan was fired, replacing him with former Sixer Doug Collins for the next season. Iverson would later on play overseas following the season.

Key dates
 June 25 – The 2009 NBA draft took place in New York City.
 July 8 – The free agency period started.
 June 1 – Eddie Jordan was named head coach of the Philadelphia 76ers.
 July 24 – After two and a half seasons with the Sixers, free agent point guard Andre Miller signed a contract with the Portland Trail Blazers.
 October 6 – The Sixers' pre season will start with a game against the Toronto Raptors.
 October 28 – The Sixers' regular season will start with a game against the Orlando Magic.
 December 2 – The Sixers' signed free agent guard Allen Iverson to a one-year contract.

Off-season

2009 NBA draft

On June 25, the Sixers selected guard Jrue Holiday from UCLA with the 17th overall pick. On July 21 it was announced that Holiday put pen to paper on his rookie deal with the 76ers.

Draft picks

Free agency
The Sixers headed into the off-season with free agents Royal Ivey, Donyell Marshall, Andre Miller, Theo Ratliff and Kareem Rush.

On June 15 Royal Ivey declined his player option with the team and Ivey became an unrestricted free agent.

After almost a month of contract negotiations with Andre Miller, the Sixers withdrew their contract offer and Miller then went on to sign with the Portland Trail Blazers on July 24.
Veteran center Theo Ratliff signed with the San Antonio Spurs on the same day.

It was confirmed on August 6 that the Sixers would not re-sign Donyell Marshall by Sixers general manager Ed Stefanski and the player's agent.

On August 4 it was announced that the Sixers had come to terms on a one-year contract with Yugoslavian born center Primož Brezec. Brezec last played in the NBA during the 2007–08 season with the Toronto Raptors.

After Royal Ivey had declined his player option on June 15, it was announced on August 10 by the Sixers that they had come to terms with free agent guard Royal Ivey.

On September 15 the Sixers signed free agent swingman Rodney Carney to a contract. Carney previously played with the Sixers from 2006 to 2008, but was traded to the Minnesota Timberwolves before the start of the 2008–09 season.

Roster

Roster Notes
 Shooting guard Allen Iverson played 28 games (his last game being on February 20, 2010) but missed the rest of the season to be with his family as they deal with an undisclosed illness of his 4-year-old daughter, Messiah. Iverson was released from the team on March 2, 2010.
 Power forward Thaddeus Young played 67 games (his last game being on March 15, 2010) but missed the remainder of the season due to a right thumb fracture.

Pre-season

Regular season

Standings

Record vs. opponents

Game log

|- bgcolor="#ffcccc"
| 1
| October 28
| @ Orlando
| 
| Marreese Speights (26)
| Elton Brand (6)
| Andre Iguodala (6)
| Amway Arena17,461
| 0-1
|- bgcolor="#bbffbb"
| 2
| October 30
| Milwaukee
| 
| Andre Iguodala (19)
| Samuel Dalembert (12)
| Andre Iguodala (7)
| Wachovia Center14,638
| 1-1
|- bgcolor="#bbffbb"
| 3
| October 31
| @ New York
| 
| Andre Iguodala (32)
| Andre Iguodala (11)
| Andre Iguodala (8)
| Madison Square Garden19,763
| 2-1

|- bgcolor="#ffcccc"
| 4
| November 3
| Boston
| 
| Andre Iguodala (17)
| Marreese Speights (9)
| Louis Williams (5)
| Wachovia Center 11,251
| 2-2
|- bgcolor="#bbffbb"
| 5
| November 6
| New Jersey
| 
| Louis Williams (18)
| Louis Williams (9)
| Louis Williams (6)
| Wachovia Center 10,054
| 3-2
|- bgcolor="#ffcccc"
| 6
| November 8
| @ Detroit
| 
| Andre Iguodala (24)
| Elton Brand (9)
| Louis Williams (5)
| Palace of Auburn Hills 17,187
| 3-3
|- bgcolor="#ffcccc"
| 7
| November 9
| Phoenix
| 
| Andre Iguodala (24)
| Andre Iguodala (9)
| Thaddeus Young, Louis Williams, Samuel Dalembert, Willie Green (3)
| Wachovia Center 10,205
| 3-4
|- bgcolor="#bbffbb"
| 8
| November 11
| @ New Jersey
| 
| Thaddeus Young (20)
| Andre Iguodala, Marreese Speights (9)
| Louis Williams (7)
| Izod Center 10,714
| 4-4
|- bgcolor="#ffcccc"
| 9
| November 13
| Utah
| 
| Thaddeus Young (17)
| Andre Iguodala (7)
| Andre Iguodala (10)
| Wachovia Center 10,738
| 4-5
|- bgcolor="#ffcccc"
| 10
| November 14
| @ Chicago
| 
| Andre Iguodala (24)
| Samuel Dalembert (12)
| Andre Iguodala (6)
| United Center21,837
| 4-6
|- bgcolor="#bbffbb"
| 11
| November 18
| Charlotte
| 
| Andre Iguodala (25)
| Elton Brand (11)
| Louis Williams (6)
| Wachovia Center11,585
| 5-6
|- bgcolor="#ffcccc"
| 12
| November 20
| Memphis
| 
| Louis Williams (31)
| Elton Brand (6)
| Andre Iguodala (9)
| Wachovia Center14,269
| 5-7
|- bgcolor="#ffcccc"
| 13
| November 21
| @ Cleveland
| 
| Louis Williams (22)
| Elton Brand (14)
| Andre Iguodala (7)
| Quicken Loans Arena20,562
| 5-8
|- bgcolor="#ffcccc"
| 14
| November 24
| @ Washington
| 
| Louis Williams (26)
| Samuel Dalembert (9)
| Louis Williams, Andre Iguodala (5)
| Verizon Center14,485
| 5-9
|- bgcolor="#ffcccc"
| 15
| November 25
| @ Boston
| 
| Andre Iguodala (25)
| Andre Iguodala, Samuel Dalembert (9)
| Andre Iguodala (9)
| TD Garden18,624
| 5-10
|- bgcolor="#ffcccc"
| 16
| November 27
| Atlanta
| 
| Thaddeus Young (22)
| Andre Iguodala (9)
| Andre Iguodala (8)
| Wachovia Center12,984
| 5-11
|- bgcolor="#ffcccc"
| 17
| November 29
| @ San Antonio
| 
| Andre Iguodala (21)
| Samuel Dalembert (14)
| Andre Iguodala (7)
| AT&T Center17,161
| 5-12
|- bgcolor="#ffcccc"
| 18
| November 30
| @ Dallas
| 
| Willie Green (23)
| Samuel Dalembert (19)
| Andre Iguodala, Jrue Holiday (4)
| American Airlines Center19,783
| 5-13

|- bgcolor="#ffcccc"
| 19
| December 2
| @ Oklahoma City
| 
| Andre Iguodala (28)
| Andre Iguodala, Samuel Dalembert (6)
| Willie Green (6)
| Ford Center17,332
| 5-14
|- bgcolor="#ffcccc"
| 20
| December 5
| @ Charlotte
| 
| Willie Green (26)
| Andre Iguodala, Thaddeus Young (11)
| Andre Iguodala (7)
| Time Warner Cable Arena13,352
| 5-15
|- bgcolor="#ffcccc"
| 21
| December 7
| Denver
| 
| Andre Iguodala (31)
| Samuel Dalembert (15)
| Allen Iverson (6)
| Wachovia Center20,664
| 5-16
|- bgcolor="#ffcccc"
| 22
| December 9
| Detroit
| 
| Andre Iguodala (18)
| Samuel Dalembert (11)
| Andre Iguodala (9)
| Wachovia Center12,136
| 5-17
|- bgcolor="#ffcccc"
| 23
| December 11
| Houston
| 
| Andre Iguodala (24)
| Samuel Dalembert (14)
| Willie Green (5)
| Wachovia Center13,991
| 5-18
|- bgcolor="#bbffbb"
| 24
| December 14
| Golden State
| 
| Thaddeus Young (26)
| Thaddeus Young (14)
| Jrue Holiday (6)
| Wachovia Center12,795
| 6-18
|- bgcolor="#ffcccc"
| 25
| December 16
| Cleveland
| 
| Andre Iguodala (26)
| Thaddeus Young (10)
| Jrue Holiday (9)
| Wachovia Center 19,517
| 6-19
|- bgcolor="#bbffbb"
| 26
| December 18
| @ Boston
| 
| Elton Brand (23)
| Marreese Speights (10)
| Jrue Holiday (7)
| TD Garden 18,624
| 7-19
|- bgcolor="#ffcccc"
| 27
| December 19
| LA Clippers
| 
| Marreese Speights (28)
| Andre Iguodala, Marreese Speights (9)
| Andre Iguodala, Jrue Holiday (7)
| Wachovia Center 13,752
| 7-20
|- bgcolor="#ffcccc"
| 28
| December 22
| @ Washington
| 
| Elton Brand (18)
| Elton Brand (12)
| Andre Iguodala (7)
| Verizon Center 15,435
| 7-21
|- bgcolor="#ffcccc"
| 29
| December 26
| @ Utah
| 
| Thaddeus Young (20)
| Samuel Dalembert (9)
| Andre Iguodala, Willie Green (3)
| EnergySolutions Arena19,911
| 7-22
|- bgcolor="#bbffbb"
| 30
| December 28
| @ Portland
| 
| Elton Brand (25)
| Elton Brand (9)
| Andre Iguodala (9)
| Rose Garden Arena20,640
| 8-22
|- bgcolor="#bbffbb"
| 31
| December 30
| @ Sacramento
| 
| Louis Williams (20)
| Andre Iguodala, Thaddeus Young, Samuel Dalembert (7)
| Andre Iguodala (9)
| ARCO Arena13,156
| 9-22
|- bgcolor="#ffcccc"
| 32
| December 31
| @ LA Clippers
| 
| Louis Williams (19)
| Samuel Dalembert (9)
| Andre Iguodala (7)
| Staples Center15,257
| 9-23

|- bgcolor="#bbffbb"
| 33
| January 3
| @ Denver
| 
| Allen Iverson (17)
| Andre Iguodala, Elton Brand (7)
| Allen Iverson (7)
| Pepsi Center19,155
| 10-23
|- bgcolor="#ffcccc"
| 34
| January 5
| Washington
| 
| Andre Iguodala, Samuel Dalembert (20)
| Samuel Dalembert (20)
| Andre Iguodala (8)
| Wachovia Center11,822
| 10-24
|- bgcolor="#ffcccc"
| 35
| January 8
| Toronto
| 
| Louis Williams (23)
| Thaddeus Young (13)
| Andre Iguodala (9)
| Wachovia Center15,264
| 10-25
|- bgcolor="#bbffbb"
| 36
| January 9
| @ Detroit
| 
| Elton Brand (25)
| Samuel Dalembert (9)
| Jrue Holiday (6)
| The Palace of Auburn Hills19,784
| 11-25
|- bgcolor="#bbffbb"
| 37
| January 11
| New Orleans
| 
| Elton Brand, Andre Iguodala (18)
| Samuel Dalembert (14)
| Andre Iguodala (8)
| Wachovia Center11,518
| 12-25
|- bgcolor="#ffcccc"
| 38
| January 13
| New York
| 
| Allen Iverson (16)
| Samuel Dalembert (21)
| Andre Iguodala (8)
| Wachovia Center12,444
| 12-26
|- bgcolor="#bbffbb"
| 39
| January 15
| Sacramento
| 
| Thaddeus Young (20)
| Samuel Dalembert (12)
| Andre Iguodala (7)
| Wachovia Center16,767
| 13-26
|- bgcolor="#ffcccc"
| 40
| January 18
| @ Minnesota
| 
| Andre Iguodala (17)
| Samuel Dalembert (10)
| Allen Iverson (9)
| Target Center14,637
| 13-27
|- bgcolor="#ffcccc"
| 41
| January 20
| Portland
| 
| Andre Iguodala (23)
| Samuel Dalembert (15)
| Louis Williams (7)
| Wachovia Center12,607
| 13-28
|- bgcolor="#bbffbb"
| 42
| January 22
| Dallas
| 
| Thaddeus Young (22)
| Samuel Dalembert (10)
| Andre Iguodala (8)
| Wachovia Center17,647
| 14-28
|- bgcolor="#bbffbb"
| 43
| January 23
| @ Indiana
| 
| Elton Brand (23)
| Samuel Dalembert (12)
| Andre Iguodala, Elton Brand (4)
| Conseco Fieldhouse16,074
| 15-28
|- bgcolor="#ffcccc"
| 44
| January 25
| Indiana
| 
| Andre Iguodala (22)
| Samuel Dalembert (13)
| Allen Iverson (6)
| Wachovia Center10,579
| 15-29
|- bgcolor="#ffcccc"
| 45
| January 27
| @ Milwaukee
| 
| Elton Brand (26)
| Samuel Dalembert (11)
| Andre Iguodala, Allen Iverson (4)
| Bradley Center12,685
| 15-30
|- bgcolor="#ffcccc"
| 46
| January 29
| LA Lakers
| 
| Allen Iverson (23)
| Samuel Dalembert (12)
| Andre Iguodala, Allen Iverson (4)
| Wachovia Center20,809
| 15-31
|- bgcolor="#bbffbb"
| 47
| January 31
| @ New Jersey
| 
| Andre Iguodala (14)
| Samuel Dalembert (11)
| Louis Williams (5)
| Izod Center11,576
| 16-31

|- bgcolor="#bbffbb"
| 48
| February 3
| Chicago
| 
| Elton Brand (26)
| Samuel Dalembert (13)
| Andre Iguodala (8)
| Wachovia Center13,295
| 17-31
|- bgcolor="#bbffbb"
| 49
| February 5
| @ New Orleans
| 
| Thaddeus Young (19)
| Samuel Dalembert (16)
| Andre Iguodala (7)
| New Orleans Arena15,162
| 18-31
|- bgcolor="#bbffbb"
| 50
| February 6
| @ Houston
| 
| Thaddeus Young (17)
| Andre Iguodala, Samuel Dalembert (10)
| Andre Iguodala (6)
| Toyota Center17,415
| 19-31
|- bgcolor="#bbffbb"
| 51
| February 9
| Minnesota
| 
| Andre Iguodala (24)
| Thaddeus Young (8)
| Louis Williams (7)
| Wachovia Center11,038
| 20-31
|- bgcolor="#ffcccc"
| 52
| February 10
| @ Toronto
| 
| Louis Williams (26)
| Andre Iguodala (8)
| Jrue Holiday (6)
| Air Canada Centre16,651
| 20-32
|- bgcolor="#ffcccc"
| 53
| February 16
| Miami
| 
| Thaddeus Young (16)
| Samuel Dalembert (10)
| Andre Iguodala (7)
| Wachovia Center15,602
| 20-33
|- bgcolor="#bbffbb"
| 54
| February 19
| San Antonio
| 
| Louis Williams, Andre Iguodala (20)
| Andre Iguodala (9)
| Andre Iguodala (8)
| Wachovia Center16,376
| 21-33
|- bgcolor="#ffcccc"
| 55
| February 20
| @ Chicago
| 
| Andre Iguodala (23)
| Elton Brand (13)
| Andre Iguodala (5)
| United Center22,147
| 21-34
|- bgcolor="#bbffbb"
| 56
| February 23
| @ Golden State
| 
| Louis Williams (26)
| Samuel Dalembert (11)
| Louis Williams, Andre Iguodala (7)
| Oracle Arena17,115
| 22-34
|- bgcolor="#ffcccc"
| 57
| February 24
| @ Phoenix
| 
| Andre Iguodala (20)
| Rodney Carney (8)
| Andre Iguodala (6)
| US Airways Center17,765
| 22-35
|- bgcolor="#ffcccc"
| 58
| February 26
| @ LA Lakers
| 
| Samuel Dalembert (24)
| Samuel Dalembert (11)
| Andre Iguodala (10)
| Staples Center18,997
| 22-36

|- bgcolor="#ffcccc"
| 59
| March 1
| Orlando
| 
| Jrue Holiday (23)
| Samuel Dalembert (11)
| Louis Williams (7)
| Wachovia Center15,817
| 22-37
|- bgcolor="#ffcccc"
| 60
| March 3
| @ Atlanta
| 
| Louis Williams (30)
| Samuel Dalembert (10)
| Andre Iguodala (7)
| Philips Arena 15,408
| 22-38
|- bgcolor="#ffcccc"
| 61
| March 5
| Boston
| 
| Louis Williams (22)
| Samuel Dalembert (8)
| Andre Iguodala (9)
| Wachovia Center19,008
| 22-39
|- bgcolor="#bbffbb"
| 62
| March 7
| @ Toronto
| 
| Thaddeus Young (32)
| Elton Brand (9)
| Andre Iguodala (10)
| Air Canada Centre18,736
| 23-39
|- bgcolor="#ffcccc"
| 63
| March 9
| @ Indiana
| 
| Jrue Holiday (21)
| Samuel Dalembert (11)
| Andre Iguodala, Jrue Holiday (4)
| Conseco Fieldhouse11,535
| 23-40
|- bgcolor="#ffcccc"
| 64
| March 10
| Charlotte
| 
| Rodney Carney (14)
| Samuel Dalembert (10)
| Jrue Holiday (8)
| Wachovia Center11,358
| 23-41
|- bgcolor="#ffcccc"
| 65
| March 12
| Cleveland
| 
| Andre Iguodala (30)
| Samuel Dalembert (12)
| Jrue Holiday (8)
| Wachovia Center20,433
| 23-42
|- bgcolor="#ffcccc"
| 66
| March 14
| @ Miami
| 
| Jason Kapono (17)
| Elton Brand (10)
| Andre Iguodala (9)
| AmericanAirlines Arena18,129
| 23-43
|- bgcolor="#ffcccc"
| 67
| March 15
| New York
| 
| Jrue Holiday (18)
| Samuel Dalembert (18)
| Jrue Holiday (6)
| Wachovia Center13,563
| 23-44
|- bgcolor="#bbffbb"
| 68
| March 17
| New Jersey
| 
| Andre Iguodala (20)
| Samuel Dalembert (9)
| Andre Iguodala (8)
| Wachovia Center11,618
| 24-44
|- bgcolor="#ffcccc"
| 69
| March 19
| @ New York
| 
| Elton Brand (19)
| Samuel Dalembert, Jrue Holiday (8)
| Willie Green (4)
| Madison Square Garden19,763
| 24-45
|- bgcolor="#ffcccc"
| 70
| March 20
| Chicago
| 
| Marreese Speights (17)
| Marreese Speights (11)
| Willie Green, Louis Williams (4)
| Wachovia Center16,098
| 24-46
|- bgcolor="#ffcccc"
| 71
| March 22
| Orlando
| 
| Elton Brand, Andre Iguodala (23)
| Samuel Dalembert (14)
| Jrue Holiday (7)
| Wachovia Center13,995
| 24-47
|- bgcolor="#bbffbb"
| 72
| March 24
| @ Milwaukee
| 
| Willie Green (16)
| Samuel Dalembert (10)
| Jrue Holiday (7)
| Bradley Center12,675
| 25-47
|- bgcolor="#bbffbb"
| 73
| March 26
| Atlanta
| 
| Andre Iguodala (25)
| Andre Iguodala (10)
| Jrue Holiday (12)
| Wachovia Center13,293
| 26-47
|- bgcolor="#ffcccc"
| 74
| March 30
| Oklahoma City
| 
| Elton Brand (22)
| Marreese Speights (8)
| Andre Iguodala (8)
| Wachovia Center14,809
| 26-48
|- bgcolor="#ffcccc"
| 75
| March 31
| @ Charlotte
| 
| Andre Iguodala (14)
| Samuel Dalembert (9)
| Jrue Holiday (6)
| Time Warner Cable Arena14,139
| 26-49

|- bgcolor="#ffcccc"
| 76
| April 3
| Toronto
| 
| Andre Iguodala (33)
| Samuel Dalembert (11)
| Andre Iguodala (11)
| Wachovia Center13,430
| 26-50
|- bgcolor="#ffcccc"
| 77
| April 6
| Detroit
| 
| Marreese Speights (21)
| Marreese Speights (6)
| Jrue Holiday (9)
| Wachovia Center13,832
| 26-51
|- bgcolor="#ffcccc"
| 78
| April 7
| @ Miami
| 
| Samuel Dalembert (19)
| Samuel Dalembert (16)
| Jrue Holiday, Andre Iguodala (6)
| AmericanAirlines Arena18,221
| 26-52
|- bgcolor="#ffcccc"
| 79
| April 9
| Milwaukee
| 
| Andre Iguodala (21)
| Samuel Dalembert (15)
| Jrue Holiday (8)
| Wachovia Center14,217
| 26-53
|- bgcolor="#bbffbb"
| 80
| April 10
| @ Memphis
| 
| Marreese Speights (22)
| Samuel Dalembert (12)
| Louis Williams (9)
| FedExForum 15,936
| 27-53
|- bgcolor="#ffcccc"
| 81
| April 12
| Miami
| 
| Jason Kapono (24)
| Samuel Dalembert (11)
| Jrue Holiday (13)
| Wachovia Center17,401
| 27-54
|- bgcolor="#ffcccc"
| 82
| April 14
| @ Orlando
| 
| Marreese Speights (23)
| Marreese Speights (8)
| Louis Williams (9)
| Amway Arena17,461
| 27-55

Player statistics

Season

|-
| 
| 76 || 57 || 30.2 || .480 || .000 || .738 || 6.1 || 1.4 || 1.1 || 1.0 || 13.1
|-
| 
| 68 || 0 || 12.6 || .401 || .304 || .825 || 2.0 || .5 || .4 || .3 || 4.7
|-
| 
| style=";"| 82 || 80 || 25.9 || style=";"| .545 || .000 || .729 || style=";"| 9.6 || .8 || .5 || style=";"| 1.8 || 8.1
|-
| 
| 1 || 0 || 4.0 || .500 || .000 || .000 || 1.0 || .0 || .0 || .0 || 2.0
|-
| 
| 73 || 18 || 21.3 || .457 || .346 || style=";"| .833 || 1.8 || 2.1 || .4 || .2 || 8.7
|-
| 
| 73 || 51 || 24.2 || .442 || style=";"| .390 || .756 || 2.6 || 3.8 || 1.1 || .2 || 8.0
|-
| 
| style=";"| 82 || style=";"| 82 ||  style=";"| 38.9 || .443 || .310 || .733 || 6.5 || style=";"| 5.8 || style=";"| 1.7 || .7 || style=";"| 17.1
|-
| 
| 57 || 12 || 17.1 || .419 || .368 || .600 || 1.2 || .7 || .4 || .1 || 5.7
|-
| 
| 19 || 0 || 12.3 || .440 || .380 || .722 || 1.4 || .9 || .3 || .0 || 5.9
|-
| 
| 56 || 2 || 11.8 || .431 || .345 || .690 || 2.4 || .6 || .4 || .5 || 3.4
|-
| 
| 62 || 1 || 16.4 || .477 || .000 || .745 || 4.1 || .6 || .5 || .6 || 8.6
|-
| 
| 64 || 38 || 29.9 || .470 || .340 || .824 || 2.9 || 4.2 || 1.2 || .2 || 14.0
|-
| 
| 67 || 45 || 32.0 || .470 || .348 || .691 || 5.2 || 1.4 || 1.2 || .2 || 13.8
|}

Awards and records

Awards
Allen Iverson- all star

Records

Injuries and surgeries

Transactions

Overview

Trades

Free agents

Additions

Subtractions

References

External links
 2009–10 Philadelphia 76ers season at ESPN
 2009–10 Philadelphia 76ers season at Basketball Reference

Philadelphia 76ers Season, 2009-10
Philadelphia 76ers seasons
Philadelphia
Philadelphia